Franca Masu (born 1962 in Alghero, Sardinia, Italy) is a singer songwriter working in the Catalan Algherese dialect. At her debut Tony Scott declared her "one of Italy's top vocal talents". 
Her songs often incorporate the work of Algherese poets.
She also sings in Portuguese.
She has released five CDs and has performed concerts in the city of Alghero, throughout Sardinia, in Italy and across Europe.

Discography 
 El meu viatge, Saint Rock, 2000
 Alguímia, Aramusica, 2003
 Aquamare, Aramusica-Felmay 2006
 Hoy como ayer, Aramusica, 2008
 10 Anys, Aramusica, 2011
 Almablava, Aramusica, 2013

Notes

External links 
 

1962 births
Living people
Catalan-language singers
People from Alghero
Italian women singers
Italian singer-songwriters
Sardinian women